The Lotrioara (in its uppermost course also: Sterpu and Voinegel) is a right tributary of the river Olt in Romania. Its source is in the Lotru Mountains. It discharges into the Olt in Lazaret.

Tributaries

The following rivers are tributaries to the river Lotrioara (from source to mouth):

Left: Brăneasa, Pârâul Cailor, Mohan, Valea Rea, Sasul, Mogoș
Right: Voineag, Pârâul Afinelor, Pologașu, Sfârcaș, Gârcu, Frasinu, Izvorul Tomnatecului, Izvorul Mielului, Tisa, Valea Neagră, Prejba, Pitulușul, Podragul, Mătrăguna

References

Rivers of Romania
Rivers of Sibiu County